This is a list of Nationalliga A seasons since the inception of the league. National League A (NLA) is a professional ice hockey league in Switzerland.

1930s
1937–38 
1938–39

1940s
1940–41 
1941–42 
1942–43 
1943–44  
1944–45  
1945–46  
1946–47  
1947–48  
1948–49  
1949–50

1950s
1950–51 
1951–52 
1952–53 
1953–54 
1954–55 
1955–56 
1956–57 
1957–58 
1958–59 
1959–60

1960s
1960–61 
1961–62 
1962–63 
1963–64 
1964–65 
1965–66
1966–67
1967–68 
1968–69 
1969–70

1970s
1970–71 
1971–72 
1972–73 
1973–74 
1974–75 
1975–76 
1976–77 
1977–78 
1978–79 
1979–80

1980s
1980–81 
1981–82 
1982–83 
1983–84 
1984–85 
1985–86 
1986–87 
1987–88 
1988–89 
1989–90

1990s
1990–91 
1991–92 
1992–93 
1993–94 
1994–95 
1995–96 
1996–97 
1997–98 
1998–99 
1999–00

2000s
2000–01 
2001–02 
2002–03 
2003–04 
2004–05 
2005–06 
2006–07 
2007–08
2008–09
2009–10
2010–11
2011–12
2012–13
2013–14
2014–15
2015–16
2016–17
2017–18

References

Ice hockey-related lists
     
Ice hockey in Switzerland
Switzerland sport-related lists